Lannion – Côte de Granit Airport or Aéroport de Lannion - Côte de Granit  is an airport located in Lannion, near the former municipality of Servel, a commune of the Côtes-d'Armor département in the Brittany région of France. It is also known as Lannion Airport or Lannion-Servel Airport.

Airlines and destinations

As of November 2018, there are no regular passenger flights at Lannion after Chalair Aviation pulled their seasonal services as the sole operator.

Statistics

References

External links 
 Aéroport de Lannion Côte de Granit (official site) 
 Aéroport de Lannion - Côte de Granit (Union des Aéroports Français) 
 
 

Airports in Brittany
Buildings and structures in Côtes-d'Armor